Michael or Mike Barnett may refer to:
 Michael N. Barnett (born 1960), constructivist scholar of international relations
 Michael P. Barnett (1929–2012), chemist and computer scientist
 R. Michael Barnett, physicist
 Michael Barnett (soccer), Australian football (soccer) player
 Big Mike (rapper) (born 1971), American rapper Michael Barnett
 Mike Barnett (athlete) (born 1961), American athlete
 Mike Barnett (baseball) (born 1959), American League baseball hitting coach
 Mike Barnett (ice hockey) (born 1948), former general manager in the NHL for the Phoenix Coyotes
 Mike Barnett (politician) (born 1946), Australian politician
 Mike Barnett, musician on the Andrew Belew  album Young Lions